Osroes of Elymais was the ruler of Elymais in the first quarter of the 2nd-century. He may have been the same person as the contemporary Parthian contender Osroes I.

References

Sources 
 
 

2nd-century Iranian people
Arsacid dynasty of Elymais
2nd-century deaths
Year of birth unknown
Vassal rulers of the Parthian Empire